The 2021 SuperUtes Series (known for commercial reasons as the 2021 Haltech SuperUtes Series) was the third running season of the motorsport series. The season started at The Bend Motorsport Park on 8 May and concluded at Mount Panorama Circuit 10 October.

Teams and drivers

Driver Changes

Team Changes

Calendar

Notes

References

SuperUtes